Comics! was a Canadian television series, which aired on CBC Television in the 1990s. A half-hour standup comedy series, the show focused on one Canadian comedian each week. The series was produced by Joe Bodolai and Sandra Faire.

References

External links

CBC Television original programming
1993 Canadian television series debuts
1999 Canadian television series endings
1990s Canadian comedy television series
Canadian stand-up comedy television series